Oenopota raduga is a species of sea snail, a marine gastropod mollusk in the family Mangeliidae.

Description
The length of the shell attains 6.5 mm.

Distribution
This species occurs in the Sea of Japan and off Kamchatka

References

 Bogdanov, I. P. (1985). Nex Species of Gastropods of the Genus Oenopota (Gastropoda, Turridae) from the far-east Seas of the USSR; Zoologichesky Zhurnal, 64(3), 448–453.

External links
  Tucker, J.K. 2004 Catalog of recent and fossil turrids (Mollusca: Gastropoda). Zootaxa 682:1-1295.

raduga
Gastropods described in 1985